Zardalu may refer to:

 Zardalu, Ardabil, Iran
 Zardalu, Kerman, Iran
 Zardalu Sofla, Lorestan Province, Iran
 Zardalu, an alien race in Charles Sheffield's Heritage Universe books.